This article lists notable musicians who have played the clarinet.

Classical clarinetists

 Laver Bariu
 Ernest Ačkun
 Luís Afonso
 Cristiano Alves
 Cesilia Pinto-Haro
 Michel Arrignon
 Dimitri Ashkenazy
 Kinan Azmeh
 Alexander Bader
 Carl Baermann
 Heinrich Baermann
 József Balogh
 Cristo Barrios
 Luigi Bassi
 Simeon Bellison
 Kálmán Berkes
 Julian Bliss
 Kalman Bloch
 Walter Boeykens
 Henri Bok
 Daniel Bonade
 Tara Bouman
 Naftule Brandwein
 Shirley Brill
 Bruno Brun
 Jack Brymer
 Lars Kristian Brynildsen
 Nicola Bulfone
 Ovanir Buosi
 Sérgio Burgani
 Louis Cahuzac
 David Campbell
 James Campbell
 Alessandro Carbonare
 Ernesto Cavallini
 Florent Charpentier
 Jonathan Cohler
 Larry Combs
 Jean-Noël Crocq
 Philippe Cuper
 Gervase de Peyer
 Hans Deinzer
 Guy Deplus
 Charles Draper
 Stanley Drucker
 Eli Eban
 Anton Eberst
 Julian Egerton
 Fredrik Fors
 Alan Frank
 Rupert Fankhauser
 Thomas Friedli
 Mariano Frogioni
 Martin Fröst
 Wenzel Fuchs
 Peter Geisler
 Anthony Gigliotti
 Bruno di Girolamo
 Johannes Gmeinder
 Jose Gonzalez Granero
 Ante Grgin
 Alan Hacker
 Chen Halevi
 Burt Hara
 Russell Harlow
 David Hattner
 Richard Haynes
 Johann Simon Hermstedt
 Johann Hindler
 Helmut Hödl
 Emma Johnson
 Sharon Kam
 Reginald Kell
 Murray Khouri
 Thea King
 Dieter Klöcker
 Howard Klug
 Béla Kovács
 Wolfgang Kornberger
 Kari Kriikku
 Alison Lambert
 Andrey Laukhin
 Colin Lawson
 Andreas Lehnert
 Karl Leister
 Michel Lethiec
 Lorin Levee
 Robert Lindemann
 Elsa Ludewig-Verdehr
 John Mahon
 Jon Manasse
 Sebastian Manz
 Robert Marcellus
 Michele Marelli
 Andrew Marriner
 Pascual Martínez-Forteza
 Lawrence Maxey
 Marco Antonio Mazzini
 William McColl
 Anthony McGill
 Ralph McLane
 Jacques Meertens
 Douglas Metcalf
 Paul Meyer
 Sabine Meyer
 Wolfgang Meyer
 Lev Mikhailov
 Pascal Moraguès
 Ricardo Morales
 Ivan Mozgovenko
 Richard Mühlfeld
 Charles Neidich
 Tale Ognenovski
 Sean Osborn
 Andreas Ottensamer
 Ernst Ottensamer
 Karen Palacios
 Edward Palanker
 Antony Pay
 Nicolai Pfeffer
 Thomas Piercy
 Frank Pilato
 George Pieterson
 Viktor Polatschek
 Manfred Preis
 Alfred Prinz
 Simon Reitmaier
 Håkan Rosengren
 Luis Rossi
 Sergei Rozanov
 Hubert Salmhofer
 Louis Sclavis
 Peter Schmidl
 Michael Seaver
 Raphaël Sévère
 David Shifrin
 Mark Simpson
 Vladimir Sokolov
 Nikola Srdić
 Anton Stadler
 Milenko Stefanović
 Karl-Heinz Steffens
 Suzanne Stephens
 Richard Stoltzman
 Peter Sunman
 Jens Thoben
 Frederick Thurston
 Alison Turriff
 Annelien Van Wauwe
 Jean-François Verdier
 Richard Sidney Walthew
 Bernard Walton
 David Weber
 Pamela Weston
 Michael Whight
 Jörg Widmann
 Leopold Wlach
 Harold Wright
 John Bruce Yeh
 Michele Zukovsky

Jazz and pop clarinetists

 Muhal Richard Abrams
 George Adams
 Sophie Alour (born 1974)
 Lloyd Arntzen
 Georgie Auld
 Nailor Azevedo (also known as Proveta)
 Paulo Moura
 Buster Bailey (1902–1967)
 Craig Ball
 Eddie Barefield
 Alan Barnes (born 1959)
 Emile Barnes
 John Barnes
 Gary Bartz
 Alvin Batiste (1932–2007)
 Heinie Beau
 Sidney Bechet (1897–1959)
 Shloimke (Sam) Beckerman (1883–1974)
 Sidney Beckerman (1919–2007)
 Han Bennink
 Derek Bermel
 Barney Bigard (1906–1980)
 Acker Bilk (1929–2014)
 Chris Biscoe
 Andy Biskin
 Dan Block
 Hamiet Bluiett
 Anthony Braxton
 Peter Brötzmann
 Pud Brown
 Sandy Brown
 Albert Burbank
 Don Byron (born 1958)
 Ernie Caceres
 Happy Caldwell
 Harry Carney
 Benny Carter
 Daniel Carter
 James Carter
 John Carter
 John Casimir
 Evan Christopher
 Rod Cless
 Tony Coe
 Anat Cohen
 Randolph Colville
 Louis Cottrell Jr.
 Hank D'Amico
 Eddie Daniels (born 1941)
 John Dankworth
 Joe Darensbourg
 Kenny Davern
 Paul Dean (clarinetist)
 Buddy DeFranco
 Tobias Delius
 Big Eye Louis Nelson Deslile
 Simon Flem Devold (1929–2015)
 Johnny Dodds (1892–1940)
 Klaus Doldinger
 Eric Dolphy (1928–1964)
 Arne Domnérus
 Jimmy Dorsey (1904–1957)
 Tommy Douglas (clarinetist)
 Paquito D'Rivera
 Gerd Dudek
 Paul Dunmall
 Kai Fagaschinski
 Wally Fawkes (1924–2023)
 Irving Fazola
 Buddy Featherstonhaugh (1909–1976)
 Giora Feidman
 John Fernandes
 Pete Fountain (1930–2016)
 Bud Freeman
 Chico Freeman
 Victor Goines
 Jimmy Giuffre
 German Goldenshtayn (Klezmer)
 Benny Goodman (1909–1986)
 Edmond Hall (1901–1967)
 Jimmy Hamilton
 Arville Harris
 Bob Helm
 Woody Herman
 Peanuts Hucko
 Dink Johnson (1892–1954)
 Theo Jörgensmann (born 1948)
 David Krakauer
 Mustafa Kandirali (1930–2020)
 Doreen Ketchens (born 1966)
 John LaPorta
 Prince Lasha
 Margot Leverett
 Walt Levinsky (1929–1999)
 George Lewis (1900–1969)
 Ted Lewis (1891–1971)
 Matt Lavelle (bass clarinet)
 Joe Maneri
 Michael Marcus
 Joe Marsala
 Stan McDonald
 Hal McKusick (1924–2012)
 Mezz Mezzrow
 Jean-Christian Michel  (born 1938)
 Marcus Miller (born 1959)
 Gabriele Mirabassi
 Gussie Mueller
 David Murray
 Don Murray (1904–1929)
 Phil Nimmons
 Jimmie Noone (1895–1944)
 Alcide Nunez (1884–1934)
 Sean O'Boyle (born 1963)
 Tale Ognenovski
 Ivo Papazov
 Art Pepper
 Ken Peplowski
 Sid Phillips (1907–1973)
 Michel Portal (born 1935)
 Doug Richford
 Perry Robinson
 Leon Roppolo (1902–1943)
 Ned Rothenberg
 Harold Rubin (1932-2020)
 Pee Wee Russell (1906–1969)
 Dan St. Marseille (born 1962)
 Tom Sancton
 Louis Sclavis
 Tony Scott (1921–2007)
 Artie Shaw (1910–2004)
 Harry Shields (1899–1971)
 Larry Shields (1893–1953)
 Omer Simeon (1902–1959)
 Bill Smith
 Chris Speed
 S. Frederick Starr (born 1940)
 Milenko Stefanović (born 1930)
 Richard Stoltzman
 Wilbur Sweatman (1882–1961)
 Antti Sarpila
 Monty Sunshine (1928-2010)
 Dave Tarras (1897–1989)
 Frank Teschemacher (1906–1932)
 Theo Travis (born 1964)
 Shankar Tucker
 Allan Vache
 Ken Vandermark
 Oliver Weindling (born 1955)
 Michael White
 Hans Olof (Putte) Wickman
 Bob Wilber
 Lester Young
 Evan Ziporyn

See also

Lists of musicians

 List
Clarinet